Nishyabda (Silence) is a 1998 Indian Kannada thriller film directed and written by Dinesh Babu and stars Vishnuvardhan, Sumanth, Mohini and Revathy in the lead roles. The film was produced by Jayashri Devi for the "Chinni Films" banner and the music is composed by Stephen-Dharma. This was Revathy's second and final Kannada film to date.

Cast

Vishnuvardhan as Major Vishwanath
Mohini as Varsha
Revathi as Dr. Vineetha
Ramakrishna as Vasu
Sumanth as Vijay
J. K. Bharavi as Veerendra Gowda
Kashi
Sihi Kahi Geetha
Sunil Puranik as Vinod Gowda
Nizhalgal Ravi as Vikram Gowda (Voice dubbed by Sanketh Kashi)
G. K. Govinda Rao as Govinda Rao, College Principal
20 Trained dogs
All characters in this movie are named with the letter V.

Legacy
Devraj Kumar titled his film as Nishabda 2 released in 2017 which had no relation with this film.

References

External links
 Kannada movies 1998 - Kannada movies released in year 1998

1998 films
1990s Kannada-language films
Indian thriller films
1998 thriller films
Films directed by Dinesh Baboo